The 2013 Presidents Cup was held October 3–6 at Muirfield Village Golf Club in Dublin, Ohio, a suburb north of Columbus.  It was the tenth Presidents Cup competition and the sixth played in the United States.

The selection of Muirfield as the 2013 tournament site was taken as a tribute to golfing great Jack Nicklaus, who designed the course.  Nicklaus has said that his involvement as tournament host for the 2013 Presidents Cup "probably will be my last involvement in anything significant in the game of golf".  Muirfield was the third U.S. course to host the tournament, and the first course in the world to host Presidents Cup, Ryder Cup, and Solheim Cup international team competitions.

In May 2012, Fred Couples and Nick Price were named captains of the U.S. and International teams, respectively.

The United States won for the fifth successive time with an 18–15 victory over the International team.

Format
The first day consists of six matches of fourball. The second day consists of six matches of foursomes. The third day consists of five matches of fourball in the morning and five matches of foursomes in the afternoon. On the fourth and final day, twelve singles matches were played. 34 matches were played in all. All fourball and foursomes matches that are all-square after 18 holes will score  point for each team. All singles matches that are all-square after 18 holes will continue until a winner is determined. The fourball matches being played first is a change from the previous seven Cups.

Team qualification and selection
Both teams had 12 players.

United States team
The United States team featured the top 10 in earnings from September 19, 2011 through September 2, 2013 (the Deutsche Bank Championship), with 2013 earnings weighted double, and two captain's picks. The captain's picks were announced on September 4, 2013.

The final standings were:

International team
The International team featured the top 10 in the Official World Golf Ranking as of September 2, 2013 and two captain's picks. The captain's picks were announced on September 4, 2013.

The final standings were:

Players

OWGR as of September 29, 2013, the last ranking before the Cup.Age as of the start of the Cup on October 3, 2013.''

Thursday's fourball matches
The American team took a one-point lead after the first day of play, winning the final three matches and halving another. Play was delayed for 90 minutes due to rain but all matches were completed.

Friday's foursomes matches
A nearly three-hour delay due to severe weather meant that only two of the six matches were completed on Friday. Phil Mickelson and Keegan Bradley defeated Jason Day and Graham DeLaet, 4 and 3, while Brendon de Jonge and Ernie Els defeated Hunter Mahan and Bill Hass, 4 and 3. The Americans led 4 to 3 at the close of play Friday. Matches resumed early Saturday morning with both sides winning two matches to tie the session at 3–3.

Saturday's matches

Morning fourball
Rain interrupted play for the third straight day. The U.S. team won four of the five matches to open a four-point lead. The matches did not end until late afternoon.

Afternoon foursomes
Due to the mornings rain delay, the afternoon foursomes were not completed Saturday. Jason Dufner and Zach Johnson defeated Richard Sterne and Marc Leishman, 4 and 3, in the only match completed Saturday. The other four matches were complete through 9 to 13 holes when play was suspended.

The table below reflects the official order. Match 19 (Sterne/Leishman vs Dufner/Johnson) began first, followed by Match 18 (Mickelson/Bradley vs Day/DeLaet), Match 22 (Simpson/Snedeker vs Oosthuizen/Schwartzel), Match 20 (Haas/Stricker vs Scott/Matsuyama), and Match 21 (Woods/Kuchar vs Els/de Jonge).

Sunday's singles matches
The matches are listed in their official order but the first five matches were actually played in this order: Matsuyama/Mahan, Day/Snedeker, DeLaet/Spieth, Els/Stricker, de Jonge/Dufner.

Individual player records
Each entry refers to the win–loss–half record of the player.

United States

International

References

External links

Presidents Cup
Golf in Ohio
Sports in Dublin, Ohio
Presidents Cup
Presidents Cup
Presidents Cup
Presidents Cup